The Outsiders was the name of an Australian-West German co-production which was made in Australia in 1976. It starred Andrew Keir as Charlie Cole and German actor Sascha Hehn as Pete Jarrett. It also featured other prominent Australian actors including John Jarratt, Wendy Hughes, Leonard Teale, Ray Barrett, Peter Cummins, John Meillon, Megan Williams, John Ewart, Judy Morris, Vincent Ball, Terry Donovan, Serge Lazareff, Peta Toppano, David Gulpilil and Roger Ward. The series was shot in English and Sascha Hehn was dubbed by Australian actor Andrew Harwood. (For the German TV version he dubbed himself.)

Plot
Charlie Cole and his grandson Pete Jarrett travel around outback Australia in a beaten-up ute, finding itinerant work along the way. In each place they befriend locals and become involved in an adventure, culminating in their solving a mystery, crime or local conflict.

Reception
The series had a merely mediocre success in Australia but inspired many German spectators because it portrayed Australia  in a way that met their expectations at a time when a new wave of German immigrants was about to come. Their reasons were among others: many areas  in Germany being relatively overcrowded, high housing costs  and Australia's beauty.

List of episodes 
 "Drop Out"
 "Change of Image"
 "Ghost Town"
 "Roustabouts"
 "Golden Girl"
 "Rip Off"
 "Bush Boy"
 "Bad Dream Town"
 "Sophie's Mob"
 "Charlie Cole Esq."
 "Opal Strike"
 "Ambush"
 "Last Campaign"

References

External links 
 
The Outsiders on www.classicaustraliantv.com
The Outsiders on YouTube
The Outsiders on ShareTV
 Discussion about The Outsiders on ABC Australia's homepage

1976 Australian television series debuts
1977 Australian television series endings
1978 German television series debuts
1978 German television series endings
English-language television shows